Amir Mohammad Hosseini (born on 7 November 1998) is an Iranian Taekwondo practitioner who lives in Hamburg, Germany. He is an International Olympic Committee (IOC) refugee athlete scholarship holder for the Tokyo Olympic Games. He participated in World Taekwondo Championships 2019 in Manchester and European Championships 2019 and also in European Taekwondo Championships 2021 as a refugee athlete. He won silver medal at the German Open 2016.

Career 
Hosseini was born in Tehran, and began Taekwondo at the age of eight. He left Iran for Germany in 2012 and started to participate at national and international tournaments in Europe the following year. In 2019 he became one of only 50 people in the world to receive a scholarship for the Tokyo Olympics 2020 which was delayed until 2021 by the COVID-19.

Events

References

External links 
 Amir Mohammad Hosseini at Olympic.org
 
 

1998 births
Living people
Sportspeople from Tehran
Iranian male taekwondo practitioners
21st-century Iranian people